Revenge of the Cybermen is the fifth and final serial of the 12th season of the British science fiction television series Doctor Who, which was first broadcast in four weekly parts on BBC1 from 19 April to 10 May 1975. It was the first to feature the Cybermen since The Invasion (1968) and the last until Earthshock (1982).

The serial is set on Space Station Nerva, now called Nerva Beacon, and the "planet of gold" Voga, thousands of years before The Ark in Space. In the serial, the Cybermen plot to destroy Voga, as the gold there is lethal to them.

Plot
Following on from Genesis of the Daleks, the Fourth Doctor, Harry and Sarah use the Time Ring to return to Space Station Nerva. They arrive aboard the space station thousands of years before the events of The Ark in Space and The Sontaran Experiment. The TARDIS is not aboard Nerva, as it is travelling back in time towards them. The trio discover that the space station is full of dead bodies.

The time travellers come into contact with the surviving Nerva crew. The space station is now operating as an orbital beacon, warning ships away from a drifting planetoid named Voga. Professor Kellman, a civilian planetary surveyor has been using Nerva as a base for cataloguing Vogan geology, travelling there via a Transmat teleportation system. Nerva Beacon is now under quarantine due to an outbreak of an unidentified plague. In space, an unknown ship approaches Nerva.

It is revealed that Voga is inhabited by a race of intelligent domed-headed beings who live beneath its surface in a network of caves. Vorus, leader of the Guardians of the mines, is leading a revolt against the Vogan leader, Chief Councillor Tyrum.

On board Nerva, a mysterious silver, snake-like creature attacks and kills a crewmember by injecting him with poison. The Doctor identifies it as a Cybermat, a cybernetic creature used by Cybermen, and that it has been responsible for the deaths aboard Nerva rather than a plague. He realises that Voga is the legendary Planet of Gold, an enemy world of the Cybermen – Cybermen are vulnerable to gold dust as it can be used to clog their breathing apparatus and suffocate them. The Doctor deduces that Cybermen are planning a fresh attack on Voga. Kellman secretly contacts the unidentified spaceship, which is crewed by Cybermen.

While the Doctor investigates Kellman, Sarah is attacked and poisoned by a Cybermat. The Doctor reasons that putting Sarah through a Transmat would cleanse her body of the toxin. Harry beams down to Voga with Sarah, who regains consciousness and recovers instantly, and they are captured by Vogans. Amid fighting between rival Vogan factions, Harry and Sarah explain their story to Tyrum and win his trust.

The Cybership docks with Nerva Beacon. Cybermen board the station and overpower the Doctor and the crew. The Cyberleader forces the Doctor and two crewmembers to strap on high-power explosives, and instructs them to beam down to Voga in the Transmat where the bombs will explode, destroying Voga. As the gold-rich environment is hostile to Cybermen, they cannot carry out the attack themselves. The bomb straps are booby-trapped so they cannot remove the bombs until they have reached Voga's core. The captives beam down with the bombs, accompanied by two Cybermen.

Kellman also beams down to Voga, where it emerges that he is a double agent working for Vorus in a plan to lure the Cybermen to Nerva Beacon. Vorus then plans to destroy the station with a giant missile, the Sky Striker. Thinking the Doctor is still aboard Nerva Beacon, Harry joins Tyrum in attempting to stop the rocket launch, while Sarah beams back up to Nerva to warn the Doctor about the rocket. She finds the station overrun with Cybermen.

Harry and Kellman are caught in a rock fall which kills Kellman. The Doctor and Harry are reunited and try to attack the Cybermen with gold dust. The Cybermen are destroyed when Nerva crewmember Lester sacrifices himself by detonating his explosive pack. On Nerva, the Cyberleader orders immediate detonation of the bombs, but Sarah intervenes, creating enough delay for the Doctor to disarm his explosive pack. The Cybermen change to an alternative plan to load Nerva Beacon with more explosives and set it on a collision course with Voga.

The Doctor Transmats back to Nerva in an attempt to stop the attack. The Doctor is forced by the Cyber-Leader to tie himself and Sarah up, where they will watch helplessly as Nerva crashes into Voga, while the Cybermen depart. On Voga, Vorus sees Nerva's collision course and launches the rocket just as he is shot by Tyrum. The Doctor unties himself and Sarah, and contacts Voga, instructing them to aim the rocket at the departing Cybership. The Cybership is destroyed, while the Doctor steers the space station away from Voga, narrowly missing an impact with the surface. Harry returns to Nerva Beacon via transmat and the TARDIS materialises on the station. The Doctor receives a message from Brigadier Lethbridge-Stewart asking him to return to 20th-century Earth due to an emergency. They quickly board the TARDIS and it dematerialises.

Production

Writing
Gerry Davis wrote the initial script, titling it Return of the Cybermen. Robert Holmes' rewrite added the Vogan elements and changed Return to Revenge. Producer Philip Hinchcliffe was new to the programme; this serial was commissioned by his predecessor Barry Letts. Letts and Holmes felt that with a new Doctor coming in and at that stage little idea of how he would be played, it would be best to play safe by using familiar big-name monsters such as the Daleks and Cybermen in the first season. The script was modified as production developed to incorporate Tom Baker's style, and also had to be rewritten to modify how writer Gerry Davis had envisaged the new Doctor – as a more timid, reserved figure much in the manner of Patrick Troughton, which happened to be rather unlike Baker's portrayal. Rewrites by Robert Holmes made the Cybermen more emotional than writer Gerry Davis was happy with. Davis was also unhappy with the story's title.

"Curse"

The story was shot on the same set as The Ark in Space – representing a substantial cost saving – with location filming in Wookey Hole Caves. It was also shot in the production block immediately after Ark, which explains why the production code is out of broadcast sequence. The location filming at Wookey Hole was plagued by a series of problems which the crew blamed on a curse. The curse apparently was brought about when the production staff found a small rock formation that the locals called "The Witch". Despite warnings, they proceeded to put a witch hat and cloak on it. Briant encountered an individual in spelunking gear which the Wookey Hole staff had no knowledge of, whom Briant was convinced was the spirit of a potholer who had died in the caves, three years earlier. The assistant floor manager suffered a severe attack of claustrophobia, another crew member fell ill, and an electrician suffered a broken leg when a ladder collapsed. During the scene when Sarah Jane rides one of the water skimmers, the boat went wild and Sladen was forced to jump off, treading water despite heavy boots until her rescue by Terry Walsh, the programme's longtime stuntman. Both required precautionary vaccinations at a local hospital but were otherwise unhurt. The boat disappeared and was never seen again.

Costumes and props

The secret radio transmitter disguised as a clothes brush, used by Kellman, is the same prop that appears in the 1973 James Bond film Live and Let Die. The prop was handed over by Bond star Roger Moore when he visited the BBC in 1973. He later told the Radio Times that the props master, not recognising Moore, had paid him two shillings and sixpence for the item: "I'd popped into the Beeb [BBC] for a cup of tea and spotted a notice about an upcoming "Doctor Who", so I thought the darlings would be so cash-strapped they'd need anything they could get their hands on. It wasn't MGM, after all. But I didn't expect to walk out with two and six!"

The masks for the principal actors playing the Vogans were specially moulded to their faces, but for the non-speaking artists the BBC had to cut costs. According to actor David Collings on the DVD commentary, who played Vorus, the masks for the extras were made using a facial mould of Dad's Army star Arnold Ridley. Originally, Cyber-costumes from the 1968 serial The Invasion were to have been used, but only two had survived, and in poor condition. This necessitated entirely new outfits, which included chest panels constructed from the innards of old television sets and trousers which, for the first time since The Moonbase, were not tucked into the Cyber-boots. Director Michael E. Briant opted to put the characters on the Nerva Beacon into contemporary clothing and have them use modern machine guns rather than attempt to depict the future through fashion.

Another first appearance is a circular symbol containing interlocking spirals which was designed by Roger Murray-Leach for the Vogan costumes and interior sets. Leach later re-used this Vogan symbol for the 1976 serial The Deadly Assassin as a symbol of the Time Lords. It later became known as the Seal of Rassilon, the founder of Time Lord society.

A Vogan costume was later reused for the Blake's 7 episode "Warlord", still sporting the "Seal of Rassilon".

Cast notes
Kevin Stoney appeared in The Daleks' Master Plan and The Invasion (1968). Michael Wisher was in The Ambassadors of Death, Terror of the Autons, Carnival of Monsters, Frontier in Space, Planet of the Daleks, Death to the Daleks, Genesis of the Daleks and Planet of Evil. Ronald Leigh-Hunt previously appeared in The Seeds of Death. William Marlowe appeared in The Mind of Evil. David Collings would later return in Mawdryn Undead and The Robots of Death.

Music
Carey Blyton composed the incidental music for this serial, his final work for the series. Producer Philip Hinchcliffe asked the BBC Radiophonic Workshop to enhance the score, which was done by Peter Howell by adding some synthesiser cues to Blyton's score. This was Howell's debut on the series but it was uncredited. Howell would go on to arrange the 1980 Doctor Who theme music and provide incidental music for the series from The Leisure Hive (1980) to The Two Doctors (1985).

Broadcast and reception

Paul Cornell, Martin Day, and Keith Topping gave the serial a negative review in The Discontinuity Guide (1995), describing it as "a contradictory, tedious, and unimaginative mess", and considered the title to be "rubbish" too. In The Television Companion (1998), David J. Howe and Stephen James Walker said that the story was neither good nor bad, but was a "disappointing way to end the season". They praised the new look of the Cybermen, the direction, and some of the supporting characters, but said "a story with a weak script and a poor plot is always going to have a struggle to impress the viewer, and Revenge of the Cybermen is no exception." In 2010, Patrick Mulkern of Radio Times gave Revenge of the Cybermen one star out of five, calling the gold revelation "a ridiculous development" and said that the Cybermen returned with "an overall lapse of scripting, performance, design and direction". However, Mulkern felt that the location work for Voga allowed the story to "occasionally gleam with life".

SFX reviewer Ian Berriman called the story a "blandly competent, meat-and-potatoes action-adventure fare". On the other hand, Berriman was positive towards the camp appeal of the Cyber Leader, the Doctor being strapped to a bomb, and the "reliably brilliant" main cast. DVD Talk's John Sinnot felt that not all of the story's criticism was warranted, and gave it three and a half out of five stars. Sinnot wrote that the Vogans were interesting and the Cybermen were "menacing" if not at their best. He still noted plot holes, and criticised the cybermats and Harry's "bumbling buffoon" character.

In a 2010 article for Den of Geek, while choosing Philip Hinchcliffe as the greatest producer of Doctor Who, Alex Westthorp cited Revenge of the Cybermen as the least successful story of his tenure.

Commercial releases

In print

A novelisation of this serial, written by Terrance Dicks, was published by Target Books in May 1976. A Polish translation was published in 1994. In the US, a novelisation was printed by Pinnacle Fiction in January 1989. An audiobook of the Target novelisation was released by BBC Audio on 3rd February 2022 read by Nicholas Briggs.

Home media
This story was the very first Doctor Who serial to be commercially released on VHS in October 1983. It was initially released in an edited omnibus format, with the opening and closing titles of each episode removed. This omnibus was also released on Betamax and Laserdisc. It was one of the very few Doctor Who releases on Video 2000. It was later released in an unedited, episodic format in May 1999 in the United Kingdom only.

The DVD of this story was released on 9 August 2010 as part of the Cybermen box set, along with the Seventh Doctor serial Silver Nemesis. It would later be released in the US as a standalone story on DVD in early November 2010. This serial was also released as part of the Doctor Who DVD Files in Issue 111 on 3 April 2013.

It was released on Blu-ray with updated special effects in Doctor Who The Collection Season 12.

References

Bibliography
 
 Haining, Peter. Doctor Who: 25 Glorious Years W H Allen (1988)

External links

 

Fourth Doctor serials
Cybermen television stories
Doctor Who serials novelised by Terrance Dicks
1975 British television episodes
Fiction set in the 30th century